Robin Klassnik OBE (born 1947) is the founder and director of Matt's Gallery.

Biography 
Klassnik moved to England in 1960, where he studied fine art at Hornsey College and Leicester College of Art. In 1968, he graduated and moved to London where he took up a Space studio at St Katharine Docks. During this time, Klassnik’s practice moved from painting to sculpture, 8mm film and photography. Klassnik’s work has been exhibited nationally and internationally at venues including the ICA, Whitechapel Art Gallery, and the Paris Biennale. Notable projects of Klassnik’s include his collaboration Five Pheromones: The Incomplete Documentation with Forensic Psychiatrist Dr. Tom Clark.

Matt's Gallery 
In 1971, Klassnik moved studios to Martello Street, London Fields, where he opened Matt’s Gallery, in 1979. Now located at Webster Road, Matt's Gallery has been described as ‘the most heroic art space in London’ and 'a little utopia'. The gallery represents twenty five artists, including Susan Hiller; Imogen Stidworthy, Nathaniel Mellors, Willie Doherty and Mike Nelson.

Teaching 
Klassnik has taught at a variety of institutions throughout his career including at the London College of Printing; Goldsmiths; Camberwell College of Arts; Chelsea College of Arts; the Royal College of Art; Slade School of Fine Art; University of Brighton; Northumbria University; University of Reading; Newcastle University; Ruskin School of Drawing and Fine Art; Valands Konsthogskola, Sweden; and Statens Kunstakademi, Oslo. He was also a Visiting Professor at Central Saint Martins School of Art and Head of Complementary Studies at Byam Shaw School of Art.

Awards 
In 1986, Klassnik was commended by the Turner Prize for his contributions to contemporary art. In 1994, Klassnik was shortlisted for the Prudential/Arts Council Award for an individual contribution to innovation and creativity in the arts. In 2014, Klassnik was awarded an OBE for services to the visual arts.

References 

British artists
1947 births
Living people